Ninja Pandav is a fantasy show that aired on Real TV from 13 March 2009.

Cast
 Vishal Thakkar...Arjun
 Pooja Pihal...Sahyadari
 Sumeet Pathak...Geoff
 Sahil Deshmukh...Nakul
 Jay Thakkar...Ghattu
 Nawab Shah...Alambush

References 

Real (TV channel) original programming
2009 Indian television series debuts
2009 Indian television series endings
Indian television soap operas
Indian fantasy television series
Ninja fiction
Martial arts television series